Laufenburg District is a district of the canton of Aargau, Switzerland, essentially consisting of the upper Fricktal valley in the Aargau Jura south of the Rhine. Its capital is the town of Laufenburg.

Geography
Of this area,  or 49.2% is used for agricultural purposes, while  or 39.2% is forested. Of the rest of the land,  or 10.4% is settled (buildings or roads).

Demographics
, 15.6% of the population are foreign nationals.

Economy
 there were 13,183 workers who lived in the district.  Of these, 9,714 or about 73.7% of the residents worked outside the district while 5,635 people commuted into the district for work.  There were a total of 9,104 jobs (of at least 6 hours per week) in the district.

Religion
Of the rest of the population, there were 128 individuals (or about 0.50% of the population) who belonged to the Christian Catholic faith.

Education
Of the school age population, there are 2,224 students attending primary school, there are 821 students attending secondary school, there are 555 students attending tertiary or university level schooling in the municipality.

Municipalities

 Includes area of Hottwil, Etzgen, Mettau, Oberhofen and Wil which merged into Mettauertal on 1 January 2010.
 Includes area of Ittenthal which merged into Kaisten on 1 January 2010.
 Includes area of Sulz which merged into Laufenburg on 1 January 2010.

Mergers
The following changes to the district's municipalities have occurred since 2000:

On 1 January 2010 the municipalities of Hottwil in the Brugg district and Etzgen, Mettau, Oberhofen and Wil in the Laufenburg district merged to form the new municipality of Mettauertal. This resulted in Hottwil transferring from Brugg to Laufenburg. At the same time the municipality of Ittenthal merged into Kaisten, and Sulz merged into Laufenburg.

 On 1 January 2022 the municipalities of Bözen, Effingen and Elfingen in the Brugg district and Hornussen in the Laufenburg district merged to form the new municipality of Böztal.

 On 1 January 2023 the municipalities of Herznach and Ueken merged to form the new municipality of Herznach-Ueken.

References

Districts of Aargau